Marka is an area of Greater Amman Municipality, Jordan.
It is to the north-east of Amman proper. Its confines include Amman Civil Airport and the Marka refugee camp.

Population as of 2020 was 167,648.

References

External links
ammancity.gov.jo

Districts of Amman